Woon Swee Oan (born Woon Liang Giok in January 1954), also known as Wen Rui'an, is a Hong Kong-based Malaysian poet and writer of wuxia novels. Some of his best known works include Jingyan Yi Qiang, Buyi Shenxiang, and Si Da Ming Bu, which have been adapted into television series The Four and Face to Fate, and the film The Four, among others.

Life
Woon was born in Bidor Town, Batang Padang District, Perak State, Malaya in 1954 in a Hakka family with ancestry from Mei County, Guangdong Province, China. In 1959, at a young age, he started reading from his family's collection of books and wrote his first short story. In 1961, he started attending primary school, and was accompanied by his elder sister because he was shy and afraid. However, soon after entering school, he became very active and outspoken in class, and was selected as the model student of the year in 1963. Throughout his years in primary to senior high school, Woon published articles in various magazines and defeated an opponent a year older than him in a debating competition when he was in secondary two. He also wrote a romantic novel titled Ouran (偶然; By Coincidence).

Between 1971 and 1972, Woon studied psychoanalysis and aesthetics. During this time, he met Fang E'zhen, who became his partner for 16 years. He also started writing for various Taiwanese magazines and published his debut wuxia novel in the Hong Kong magazine Wuxia Chunqiu. In 1973, he established a poetry society and published his first novel in the series Si Da Ming Bu (四大名捕; The Four Great Constables). At the end of the year, he travelled to Taiwan to further his studies at the National Taiwan University.

In 1976, Woon and Fang E'zhen established the Shenzhou Poetry Society in Taiwan. However, not long later, they were accused of "promoting communism" by the Taiwanese government and detained for three months; the society was disbanded. They were sent back to Malaysia later, but were subsequently forced to move to Hong Kong due to the Malaysian government's strong stance against communism.

In 1981, after moving to Hong Kong, Woon published the wuxia novel series Shenzhou Qixia (神州奇俠; Hero of Shenzhou) in the newspaper Ming Pao. In the second half of 1983, ATV recruited Woon to be one of their writers. In the same year, Woon's works were published by Bok Yik, a sub-company under TVB. His wuxia novels were later re-released by a Taiwanese publisher, Wansheng. Woon's novel series Si Da Ming Bu and Buyi Shenxiang were also adapted by ATV into television series.

In 1988, Taiwan's CTV released a television series based on Woon's novel series Si Da Ming Bu. Woon also wrote wuxia serials in the Taiwanese newspapers China Times and United Daily News. At the end of the year, Woon started his own magazine company in Hong Kong to promote his "new school" of wuxia stories. From 1990 to 1998, Woon ventured into the mainland Chinese market and spent most of his time in China. His most recent works such as Da Laohu, Bu Laoshu and Yuanhou Yue were published by Crown House Publishing in Hong Kong.

List of works

 Si Da Ming Bu series
 Si Da Ming Bu Hui Jingshi
 Si Da Ming Bu Da Duijue
 Si Da Ming Bu Chao Xin Pai
 Si Da Ming Bu Da Laohu
 Si Da Ming Bu Zhen Guandong
 Si Da Ming Bu Zhan Tianwang
 Nishui Han
 Buyi Shenxiang series
 Sharen De Xintiao
 Yemengse
 Tianwei
 Laiyao'er
 Luohua Jianying
 Daoba Ji
 Shenzhou Qixia series
 Shenzhou Qixia
 Jianqi Changjiang
 Liangguang Haojie
 Jiangshan Ruhua
 Yingxiong Haohan
 Chuangdang Jianghu
 Shenzhou Wudi
 Jimo Gaoshou
 Tianxia Youxue
 Xuehe Che
 Da Zongshi
 Xiaoyao You
 Yangsheng Zhu
 Ren Shijian
 Daxia Chuanqi
 Tangfang Yizhan
 Shuo Yingxiong, Shei Shi Yingxiong series
 Wenrou De Dao
 Yinu Bajian
 Jingyan Yi Qiang
 Shangxin Xiaojian
 Chaotian Yigun
 Qunlong Zhi Shou
 Tianxia Youdi
 Tianxia Wudi
 Tianxia Diyi
 Tiandi
 Xiandai series
 Sha Le Ni Hao Ma?
 Qing Jie Furen Yiyong
 Qing Ni Dongshou Wan Yidian
 Zhanseng Yu He Ping
 Da Bu Liang De Dahuoji
 Sharen Zhe Tang Zhan
 Zao Hen

 Dao
 Zha
 Rufang
 Shaqin
 Jieju
 Duanliao
 Liaoduan
 Jidao
 Da Cisha
 Xijiang Yue
 Xue Zai Shao
 Nü Shenbu
 Mishen Yin
 Luoye Xinya
 Tanzhi Xiangsi
 Shashou Shanzai
 Renxing Lian'ou
 Mashang Shangma
 Zhulian De Suiyue
 Shashou De Cibei
 Wanshang De Xiaoshi
 Aoman Yu Pian Jian
 Aishang Ta De Heshang
 Aishang Heshang De Ta
 Juedui Buyao Rewo
 Laoge, Jietou Yiyong
 Qing, Qingqing, Qingqingqing
 Pengyou, Ni Si Guo Wei?
 Xihuan Yanse De Mentu
 Shiqu Shetou Le Ma?
 Sha Chu
 Qi Sha
 Jin Xue
 Xia Shao
 Daming Wang
 Jinxiu Renpi
 Jianghu Xianhua
 Tunhuo Qinghuai
 Luanshi Qinghuai
 Luori Daqi
 Jiangjun De Jianfa
 Daocong Li De Shi
 Qi Da Kou series
 Jin Zhi Xiazhe series
 Hongdian Lanya series
 Baiyi Fang Zhen Mei series

Adaptations 
Return of the Bastard Swordsman (1984)
The Undercover Agents (ATV, 1984)
The Assassin (1993)
Four Marshals (2003)
Treacherous Waters (2004)
Musketeer and Princess (2004)
The Four Detective Guards (2004)
Strike at Heart (2005)
Face to Fate (2006)
The Four (TVB, 2008)
The Four (film) Trilogy (2012-2014)
The Four (2015) (Hunan TV, 2015)
Heroes (2021)
Ni Shui Han (TBA)

External links
 Wen Ruian
 Wuxiasociety.com – An English Wuxia Portal, focus on discussion forum, the most complete list of Woon Swee Oan's novels in English (work in progress).
 

1954 births
Living people

Hong Kong novelists
Hakka writers
Hong Kong people of Hakka descent
People from Meixian District
Malaysian emigrants to Hong Kong
Malaysian people of Hakka descent
Malaysian novelists
National Taiwan University alumni
Wuxia writers
People from Perak